The Vancouver Film Critics Circle Award for Best Screenplay is an annual award given by the Vancouver Film Critics Circle.

Winners and nominees

2000s

2010s

2020s

References

Vancouver Film Critics Circle Awards
Canadian documentary film awards